Yaku Sacha Pérez Guartambel (born Carlos Ranulfo Pérez Guartambel, 26 February 1969), often simply known as Yaku Pérez, is an Ecuadorian politician and indigenous rights, human rights activist, who ran for president of the country in the 2021 Ecuadorian presidential elections and came third in the first round.

Ethnically Cañari, Pérez is a former member of the eco-socialist Pachakutik Party. On 14 May 2019, she was elected as Provincial Prefect of the Azuay Province. As the former president of indigenous rights group ECUARUNARI, Pérez then rose to national prominence during the 2019 demonstrations against President Lenín Moreno's neoliberal economic policies. Described as an "anti-mining activist", Pérez has been involved in protests against water privatization efforts and the proposed Quimsacocha mining project, which led to her being charged with terrorism. Though a leftist, Pérez is noted for opposing the extractive measures championed by former socialist President Rafael Correa and his allies.

Early life and education 
Pérez was born in the Cuenca Canton of the Azuay Province on February 26, 1969. Pérez holds:

 a J.D. from the University of Cuenca, with specializations in indigenous justice, environmental law, criminal law and criminology;
 an advanced diploma in Watershed Management and Population from the Universidad de Cuenca.;
 a specialization in Penal Law and Indigenous Justice from UNIANDES;
 a specialization in Environmental Law from the Universidad Técnica Particular de Loja (UTPL);
 a master's degree in criminal law and criminology from UNIANDES

In 2017, she legally changed her name to Yaku Sacha, which translates to "Forest of Water" in the Quechua language. She stated that she consulted with both her mother and Pachamama before making her name change. Her heritage is Quechua Cañari.

Pérez's first wife, Verónica Cevallos, passed away in 2012, following complications from cancer.

In 2013 she married Manuela Lavinas Picq, a French-Brazilian academic, through a Cañari ancestral rite. Picq was forcibly deported from Ecuador by the Rafael Correa government, due to political persecution.

Early political career 
After being involved in the Federation of Indigenous and Farming Organizations, Pérez became a city councilor in Cuenca, Ecuador in 1996.

In 2002, she participated in protests against Lucio Gutiérrez that sought to stop the privatisation of the water supply.

During the presidency of Rafael Correa, he was charged with "sabotage and terrorism" for blocking the roads in protest against the Quimsacocha mining project.

As an activist, Pérez announced her candidacy for the presidency of Ecuador in the 2017 Ecuadorian general election, but lost in the Pachakutik primary election to National Assembly member Lourdes Tibán. He later endorsed the center-right opposition candidate Guillermo Lasso in the run-off election, against Correa's deputy, the PAIS Alliance candidate Lenín Moreno, saying "A banker is preferable to a dictatorship that has deprived us of our territories, that has declared a state of exception, that has locked us in jail".

In 2017, she was elected to lead the Andean Coordination of Indigenous Organizations, ECUARUNARI.

Rise to political prominence and presidential candidacy 

In May 2019, Pérez was elected to serve as the Prefect of the Azuay Province. During her tenure as Prefect, Pérez prioritized environmental and water policy, carrying out reforestation, promoting bicycle use in the province, and pushing to eliminate single-use plastic bags.

Pérez rose to national prominence for her role in the 2019 demonstrations against the neoliberal economic policies of President Lenín Moreno.

Pérez belongs to the right-wing faction of Pachakutik, defending a "flexible and open left", hostile to the policies of Rafael Correa. She has said a free trade agreement with the United States is not an unreasonable proposal, depending on its details.

She was a candidate in the 2021 Ecuadorian general election, coming in to a close third place, according to the controversial and partially revoked election commission. Initial exit polls put her at 20% in the first round of elections, making her the second-place candidate and therefore would participate in the run-off election against the former minister under Rafael CorreaAndrés Arauz. This was considered a surprising result, as unreliable and possibly biased pre-election polling had put Pérez in third place, behind Arauz and right-wing banker Guillermo Lasso. While the Left-wing candidate Arauz proposed giving $1000 to one million working-class Ecuadorian families - as Ecuador grappled with the social and economic impacts of COVID-19 crisis - Pérez attacked that plan on the grounds that poor citizens would spend all the money on beer in one day.

In her first statement after the announcement of the partial results, Pérez welcomed a "victory for ecology and the defense of water".

On 19 May 2021, Pérez left Pachakutik in disagreement over the party's legislators working together with CREO to elect the new speaker of the National Assembly. She had earlier expressed her opposition to any legislative alliance with either of CREO or UNES.

Further reading 
 Brendan O'Boyle:  Yaku Pérez: The New Face of Ecuador’s Left?, Americas Quarterly, publisher think tank Americas Society/Council of the Americas (AS/COA), 1 February 2021.
 Interview with Yaku Pérez - Turning our eyes to indigenous peoples, interview conducted by Gonzalo Berrón from think tank Transnational Institute,  on 27 August 27, 2019.
 ‘Barbarism or solidarity’ at stake at Ecuador elections, says indigenous presidential candidate, Interview with Yaku Pérez, openDemocracy, 5 February 2021

References

Provincial Prefects of Ecuador
1969 births
Living people
Ecuadorian people of indigenous peoples descent
Indigenous rights activists
Pachakutik Plurinational Unity Movement – New Country politicians
Ecuadorian activists